Radhapuram may refer to:
 Radhapuram taluk
 Radhapuram (state assembly constituency)